Villarrica National Reserve is a national reserve in Chile. It consists of eleven separate sections and is also known as Hualalafquén, which in turn is the name of the main section of the reserve.

The reserve's boundaries have changed since its creation. Its original extension was reduced to create Huerquehue and Villarrica National Parks. 

The reserve is accessible via Chile Route 199.

References

National reserves of Chile
Protected areas of La Araucanía Region